Here Today, Gone Tamale is a 1959 Warner Bros. Looney Tunes animated short, directed by Friz Freleng. The short was released on August 29, 1959, and stars Speedy Gonzales and Sylvester.

Plot
At a Mexican shipping port all the mice are starving to death. Suddenly a ship arrives from Switzerland with a cargo fill with cheese docks. They smell the cheese and race toward the ship, only to be chased away by Sylvester, who has been hired to guard all the cheese.

The mice suggest that the only mouse to get by Sylvester is Speedy Gonzales. He is called to help get the cheese to the mice. Sylvester challenges Speedy to get by, which he does easily. Speedy goes back and forth to deliver the cheese to the mice. All attempts to stop Speedy (from netting him to using a guillotine) fail.

The final shot shows the mice happy with all their food as they dance in celebration. Sylvester sees this and declares "well, if you can beat them, join them I always say". He wears mouse ears and dances with the mice. Speedy sees this and claims that the cat has "gone loco in the cabeza". Speedy joins in the dancing as well, as the cartoon ends.

References

External links 
 

1959 animated films
1959 short films
1950s Warner Bros. animated short films
Looney Tunes shorts
Short films directed by Friz Freleng
1959 films
Speedy Gonzales films
Sylvester the Cat films
Animated films about cats
Animated films about mice
Films set in Mexico
Films scored by Milt Franklyn
Films with screenplays by Michael Maltese
1950s English-language films
Films set on ships